Osvaldo Valenti (17 February 1906 – 30 April 1945) was an Italian film actor. He appeared in more than 50 films between 1928 and 1945. He was born in Istanbul, Turkey to a Sicilian carpet trader and a wealthy Lebanese woman of Greek descent. He and his lover, Luisa Ferida, were executed by partisans in Milan, Italy, due to their links with Fascism. Their story was portrayed in the 2008 film Wild Blood.

Partial filmography

 Hungarian Rhapsody (1928) – Der Fähnrich
 Five to Nil (1932) – Barenghi
 La signorina dell'autobus (1933) – Giacomo
 La fortuna di zanze (1933)
 Ragazzo (1934) – Malvivente di borgata
 Creatures of the Night (1934)
 The Dance of Time (1936)
 The Countess of Parma (1936) – Duca di Fadda
 Queen of the Scala (1937)
 Mia moglie si diverte (1938) – Tommy Bolden
 Ettore Fieramosca (1938) – Guy de la Motte
 La signora di Montecarlo (1938)
 A Thousand Lire a Month (1939) – Gabriele Corodi
 The Widow (1939) – Padova, il pittore
 The Fornaretto of Venice (1939) – Alvise Duodo
 Frenzy (1939) – Sigfrido
 Hurricane in the Tropics (1939) – Il tenente Reguero
 An Adventure of Salvator Rosa (1939) – Lamberto d'Arco
 Una lampada alla finestra (1940) – Dick
 Fanfulla da Lodi (1940) – Franco di Genova
 Trappola d'amore (1940) – Il conte di Brazeuil
 Antonio Meucci (1940) – Giuseppe Garibaldi giovane
 Beyond Love (1940) – Livio Sabelli
 Abandonment (1940) – Leonard
 Boccaccio (1940) – Berto
 La leggenda azzurra (1940) – L'ufficiale straniero
 La zia smemorata (1940) – Paolo Ravelli
 Captain Fracasse (1940) – Il duca Ruggero di Vallombrosa
 I pirati del golfo (1940)
 Idyll in Budapest (1941) – Sandor
 Giuliano de' Medici (1941) – Franceschino de' Pazzi
 The King of England Will Not Pay (1941) – Il secondo Antellesi
 The Iron Crown (1941) – Eriberto
 Beatrice Cenci (1941) – Giacomo Cenci
 Don Buonaparte (1941) – Maso
 The Mask of Cesare Borgia (1941) – Cesare Borgia
 The Secret Lover (1941) – Valentini
 First Love (1941) – Giovannino Cafiero
 Il vetturale del San Gottardo (1941) – Mortens
 La sonnambula (1941) – Il conte Osvaldo Merola
 Sancta Maria (1942) – Jack
 The Jester's Supper (1942) – Giannetto Malespini
 The Two Orphans (1942) – Pietro
 Sleeping Beauty (1942) – Don Vincenzo Caramandola
 Orizzonte di sangue (1942) – Alioscia
 Fedora (1942) – Vladimiro Yariskine
 Luisa Sanfelice (1942) – Nelson
 Piazza San Sepolcro (1942) – Napoleone da giovane
 Knights of the Desert (1942) – Il capitano Serra
 Gli ultimi filibustieri (1943) – Ramon de la Sierra
 La valle del diavolo (1943) – Il barone Rider
 Harlem (1943) – Chris Sherman
 Enrico IV (1943) – Il conte Enrico Di Nolli / Enrico IV
 The Innkeeper (1944) – Cavaliere di Ripafratta
 Fatto di cronaca (1945)

Bibliography
Gundle, Stephen. Mussolini's Dream Factory: Film Stardom in Fascist Italy. Berghahn Books, 2013.

References

External links

1906 births
1945 deaths
Male actors from Istanbul
Deaths by firearm in Italy
Italian male film actors
Executed Italian people
Italian people of Greek descent
Italian people of Lebanese descent
Turkish people of Italian descent
20th-century Italian male actors
Italian fascists
People executed by Italy by firing squad
People of the Italian Social Republic